A list of people, who died during the 3rd century, who have received recognition as Saints (through canonization) from the Catholic Church:

See also 

Christianity in the 3rd century
List of Church Fathers

03
 
Saints